"California Dreamin'" is a song written by John Phillips and Michelle Phillips and first recorded by Barry McGuire. The best-known version is by the Mamas & the Papas, who sang backup on the original version and released it as a single in 1965. The lyrics express the narrator's longing for the warmth of Los Angeles during a cold winter in New York City. It is recorded in the key of C-sharp minor.

"California Dreamin'" became a signpost of the California sound, heralding the arrival of the nascent counterculture era. It was certified gold by the Recording Industry Association of America in June 1966 and was inducted into the Grammy Hall of Fame in 2001. In 2021, Rolling Stone placed the song at number 420 in its "500 Greatest Songs of All Time" list.

History
The song was written in 1963 while John Phillips and Michelle Phillips were living in New York City during a particularly cold winter, and the latter was missing sunny California.  John would work on compositions late at night and brought Michelle the first verse one morning. At the time, John and Michelle Phillips were members of the folk group the New Journeymen, which evolved into the Mamas and the Papas.

They earned their first record contract after being introduced to Lou Adler, the head of Dunhill Records, by Barry McGuire. In thanks to Adler, they sang the backing vocals to "California Dreamin with members of the session band The Wrecking Crew on McGuire's album This Precious Time. Adler, impressed with the  Mamas and the Papas, then had the lead vocal track re-recorded with Denny Doherty singing and paired with the same instrumental and backing vocal tracks and an alto flute solo by Bud Shank, reportedly improvised.  The guitar introduction was performed by P. F. Sloan. McGuire's original vocal can be briefly heard on the left channel at the beginning of the record, having not been completely erased.

The single was released in late 1965 but was not an immediate breakthrough. After gaining little attention in Los Angeles upon its release, a radio station in Boston was the catalyst to break the song nationwide. After making its chart debut in January 1966, the song peaked at No. 4 in March on both the Billboard Hot 100, lasting 17 weeks, and Cashbox, lasting 20 weeks.  "California Dreamin'" was the top single on the Billboard end-of-the-year survey for 1966.  It and SSgt. Barry Sadler's "Ballad of the Green Berets" tied for #1 on the Cashbox end-of-the-year survey for that year as well.  "California Dreamin" also reached number 23 on the UK charts upon its original release, and re-charted after its use in a Carling Premier commercial in 1997, peaking at number nine there.  Billboard described the song as having "a fascinating new sound with well written commercial material" and praised Lou Adler's production."  Cash Box described it as a "medium-paced, rhythmic shufflin’ romantic woeser with a plaintive, lyrical undercurrent."

The song is repeatedly used in the 1994 Hong Kong film Chungking Express as a central plot point  and a cover by the Beach Boys was used on season 4 of Stranger Things.

Michelle Phillips wrote the lyrics, "Well, I got down on my knees, and I pretend to pray," but Cass Elliot had sung "began" on the original recording and had continued doing so on tour until corrected by Phillips.

Chart history

Weekly charts

Year-end charts

Certifications

Other versions

America version

In the spring of 1979, the band America reached No. 56 on the Billboard Hot 100 with their remake of "California Dreamin'" which was the first studio recording by America as the duo of Gerry Beckley and Dewey Bunnell without third founding member Dan Peek, who had departed the group in 1977. Bunnell – who sang lead – and Beckley – who sang background – self-produced the track which featured America's touring musicians: David Dickey, drummer Willie Leacox, guitarist Michael Woods, percussionist Tom Walsh, and Jim Calire who played keyboards and also saxophone.

America performed "California Dreamin at least once in concert in 1974, "California Dreamin'" being a sentimental favorite of the band's members having been a setlist staple of the cover band in which all three had performed while London Central High School students in the late 1960s. The recording of "California Dreamin'" by America was specifically made to play under the closing credits of the American International Pictures (AIP) movie release California Dreaming  which had been shot in the final months of 1977 for release in the summer of 1978 although the movie was held back from wide release until 16 March 1979 with America recording the song "California Dreamin'" in the autumn of 1978: Beckley and Bunnell agreed to record the song after being (at least partially) shown the movie – (Gerry Beckley quote:) "We liked what we saw" – and the track was recorded at Studio 55 (Hollywood): (Gerry Beckley quote:) "We did it more as a rock thing [compared to the original], [with] a full sound but reliant on the harmonies."

The track was originally scheduled for a 15 January 1979 release which was delayed until after AIP's February 1979 pacting with Casablanca Records to distribute the  California Dreaming soundtrack, Casablanca having recently managed to bolster the modest success of the film Thank God It's Friday through a hit soundtrack album: the recording of "California Dreamin'" by America was therefore given parallel release with the movie, another soundtrack item: "See It My Way" by session group F.D.R., serving as B-side. Both the America single and (in April 1978) the soundtrack album were issued by AIP on its own label (distributed by Casablanca): outside the US and Canada, Casablanca acted as label of release.
 
By the spring of 1979, America were involved in sessions for their Capitol Records debut album Silent Letter and were either unable or uninterested in promoting their version of "California Dreamin'" which single proved unable to buoy its parent film's faltering box office take. However the publicity inherent in the film's release was evidently enough to afford minor hit status to America's soundtrack item (heard in the film's trailer, America's "California Dreamin was also cited in the movie's poster), and despite its lowly chart peak, America's "California Dreamin remake was more successful than any of their first five Capitol single releases, none of which ranked in the Hot 100 (the band's sixth Capitol single release, "You Can Do Magic" in 1982 afforded the band a sole latter-day top ten hit).

"California Dreamin continued to be featured in America's live gigs eventually being established as a mandatory America concert title. A live performance of the song by America is featured on In Concert, the band's 1996 album release of a 1982 live gig. The band's 1978 recording was included on the 2000 America retrospective box set Highway: 30 Years of America as well as on The Complete Greatest Hits in 2001.

Beach Boys version

Background
The Beach Boys recorded "California Dreamin'" in 1986 for their greatest hits compilation Made in U.S.A. It was produced by Terry Melcher and featured Roger McGuinn of the Byrds on 12-string guitar.  This version of the song was referenced in the lyrics of the Dead Milkmen's 1988 novelty hit "Punk Rock Girl".

Although the song only charted at a modest number 57 on the Billboard Hot 100, it reached number 8 on the Billboard Adult Contemporary and it was supported by a music video that saw heavy rotation on MTV. The video featured the Beach Boys along with John Phillips, Michelle Phillips and Roger McGuinn.  Denny Doherty was on the East coast and declined; Cass Elliot had died in 1974.  This version would later appear in the fourth season of Stranger Things.

Personnel
Credits sourced from Craig Slowinski and Andrew G. Doe.

The Beach Boys
Carl Wilson – vocals
Al Jardine – vocals
Mike Love – vocals
Brian Wilson – vocals
Bruce Johnston – vocals
Additional musicians and production staff
Roger McGuinn – 12-string lead guitar
Jeff Foskett – possible vocals
Adrian Baker – possible vocals
unknown – bass, drums, acoustic lead guitar, saxophone, synthesizer

Jose Feliciano version

Credits sourced from Disco GS and Allmusic guide.

Released as a single on RCA Records in the summer of 1968, José Feliciano's arrangement reached number 43 on the Billboard Hot 100 chart and number 20 on the Billboard Rhythm & Blues Singles chart. The song was the A-side of a single which became a big hit when radio stations started to play the B-side with his cover of "Light My Fire", which reached number 3 on the Billboard Hot 100 and was popular in many other countries around the world. This elaborate string version with jazz Latin influences serves as the opening track of Feliciano's 1968 hit album Feliciano! (gold status in 1968), and was heard in a key sequence in Quentin Tarantino's 2019 film Once Upon a Time in Hollywood and is included on its soundtrack.

Personnel
Credits sourced from album Feliciano!

José Feliciano – vocals, guitar
Ray Brown – bass
Jim Horn – flute, alto flute
Milt Holland – percussion
Bruce Johnston – vocals
Additional musicians and production staff
George Tipton – orchestral arrangements
Rick Jarrard – producer

Freischwimmer version
A tropical house version by German DJ/remixer Freischwimmer was released in 2015. This version reached number one on the Billboard Dance Club Songs chart in its February 13, 2016 issue. "Dreamin" had never before hit No. 1 on any ranking, making this version the first in its nearly 50-year history to reach the top spot on a Billboard chart.

This version was later used in the Star Trek: Picard second season episode "Assimilation".

Other notable versions
In 1966, the Wes Montgomery album with "California Dreamin'" as the title track, was released and reached No. 1 on the Billboard Jazz chart, and No. 4 on the R&B chart.
Also in 1966, French-Egyptian singer Richard Anthony recorded a cover in French titled Le Terre Promise ("The Promised Land"), whose lyrics evocates biblical Exodus.
In 1969, Bobby Womack's cover of "California Dreamin'" from his debut album Fly Me to the Moon proved a hit, spending two weeks on the Billboard Hot 100.
In 1978, a disco version proved popular in European clubs for the Italian project Colorado, reaching 45 on the British charts.
In 1996, Japanese punk band Hi-Standard released a cover on their 7" California Dreamin''' on the Fat Wreck Chords label.  This cover was later included on the Fat Wreck Chords compilation album Survival of the Fattest.
In 2004, German techno house group Royal Gigolos sampled the song on a track by the same name from their Musique Deluxe album. The song reached number 2 on the French charts and reached the top 40 of various charts across Europe.
Sia recorded the song for the disaster film San Andreas. The song came out in May 2015 and was featured in the movie's trailers. The song reached the top 20 in Lebanon, peaking at No. 14. The song also reached No. 92 on the UK Singles Chart,  on the Scottish Singles Chart, and No. 87 on the SNEP singles chart.
Jazz artist Aubrey Logan and former American Idol contestant Casey Abrams recorded a new version in 2017, featured on Logan's album Impossible.
Gothic rock band Dead Artist Syndrome recorded a version of this song for their 1992 album Devils Angels & Saints''.
 Omar Apollo recorded an acoustic version of this song as a Spotify two-single exclusive as part of the platform's Spotify Singles in 2022.

See also
 List of Billboard Dance Club Songs number ones of 2016

References

External links

 ''California Dreamin''' at Myspace (streamed copy where licensed)
NPR's "Present at the Creation" segment on the origins of the song
Technical article describing how California Dreamin' was originally mixed
Facts and discussion about the song
Review Of California Dreaming

 
 

1963 songs
1965 singles
1968 singles
1979 singles
1986 singles
Songs written by John Phillips (musician)
The Mamas and the Papas songs
Bobby Womack songs
The Lettermen songs
The Carpenters songs
America (band) songs
The Beach Boys songs
Sia (musician) songs
Song recordings produced by Lou Adler
Grammy Hall of Fame Award recipients
Songs about California
Songs about Los Angeles
Songs about hippies
2004 debut singles
Royal Gigolos songs
2016 singles
Dunhill Records singles
RCA Victor singles
Capitol Records singles
Minit Records singles